Lukather is the first solo studio album by Toto guitarist Steve Lukather, released on August 28, 1989 through Columbia Records.

History
Lukather came about after Toto had been recording and playing for eleven years and the band consensus was to take a break. Since Lukather had a number of songs written that did not appear on Toto albums, he decided to pursue a solo album. His intention was to present a dimension of his musical work that fans would not be familiar with, and he collaborated with many notable musicians. Among the people involved in Lukather were Eddie Van Halen, Steve Stevens, Richard Marx, Jan Hammer, and fellow Toto members Jeff Porcaro and David Paich.

Lukather has stated that the album is produced in a very simple manner and that one can hear a lot of ambient studio noise such as counting off on various tracks. He also credits bands Pink Floyd, Cream, Led Zeppelin, and guitarists Jimi Hendrix, David Gilmour, Jeff Beck, and Eric Clapton as influences on the album. Much of the material was debuted live in late 1988 when Lukather did a number of solo live dates in the Los Angeles area while the album was being recorded.

Track listing

 "Twist the Knife" (Lukather, Eddie Van Halen) – 5:24
 "Swear Your Love"  (Lukather, Richard Marx) – 4:00
 "Fall into Velvet"  (Lukather, Cy Curnin, Steve Stevens) – 9:03
 "Drive a Crooked Road"  (Lukather, Danny Kortchmar) – 5:20
 "Got My Way"  (Lukather, Randy Goodrum, Michael Landau) – 4:57
 "Darkest Night of the Year"  (Lukather, Stevens) – 5:19
 "Lonely Beat of My Heart"  (Lukather, Diane Warren) – 4:17
 "With a Second Chance"  (Goodrum, Lukather) – 4:36
 "Turns to Stone"  (Goodrum, Lukather) – 5:35
 "It Looks Like Rain"  (Tom Kelly, Lukather, Billy Steinberg) – 4:21
 "Steppin' on Top of Your World"  (Kortchmar, Lukather) – 5:41

Personnel 
Adapted from album's liner notes.

 Steve Lukather – lead vocals, backing vocals (1, 2, 4, 6, 8), guitar (1–3, 5-9), guitar solo (3, 4, 10), "backwards" guitar (3), synthesizers (4, 7, 8, 9), keyboards (9), drum programming (9), acoustic guitar (10), 12-string guitar (10), lead guitar (11), rhythm guitar (11)

Additional musicians

 C.J. Vanston – keyboards (2)
 Jan Hammer – Hammond B3 organ (3), synth solo (3)
 Eric Rehl – synthesizers (3, 6), effects (3, 6)
 Randy Goodrum – synthesizers (5, 9), synthesizer programming (8), drum programming (8, 9), backing vocals (9)
 Aaron Zigman – synthesizers (5)
 Kim Bullard – keyboards (7)
 David Paich – organ (7)
 Jai Winding – keyboards (10)
 Steve Stevens – guitar (3), guitar solo (3)
 Danny Kortchmar – rhythm guitar (4, 11), backing vocals (4), keyboards (11), percussion (11), sequencing (11)
 Michael Landau – guitar (5, 10)
 Eddie Van Halen – bass (1)
 Neil Stubenhaus – bass (2, 7)
 Will Lee – bass (3, 6)
 John Pierce – bass (4, 11)
 Randy Jackson – bass (5, 10)
 Leland Sklar – bass (9)
 Carlos Vega – drums (1)
 Prairie Prince – drums (2)
 Thommy Price – drums (3, 6)
 Jeff Porcaro – drums (4, 11)
 John Keane – drums (5, 7, 10), backing vocals (5, 9)
 Lenny Castro – percussion (1, 3, 5, 10)
 Warren Ham – backing vocals (1), ad-libs (1)
 Richard Marx – backing vocals (2, 7)
 Cindy Mizelle – backing vocals (3), ad-libs (3)
 Stan Lynch – backing vocals (4, 11)
 Tom Kelly – backing vocals (5, 10)
 Tommy Funderburk – backing vocals (7)
 Ivan Neville – backing vocals (12)

Production 

 Steve Lukather – producer 
 Eddie Van Halen – producer (1)
 Richard Marx – producer (2)
 Steve Stevens – producer (3, 6)
 Danny Kortchmar – producer (4, 11)
 Randy Goodrum – producer (lead vocal on 5), producer (8, 9)
 Richie Zito – producer (7)
 Tom Kelly – producer (10)
 Billy Steinberg – producer (10)
 Michael Bosley – assistant engineer 
 Charlie Brocco – assistant engineer
 Rick Clifford – assistant engineer
 Paul Dieter – assistant engineer
 Ken Felton – assistant engineer
 Clark Germain – assistant engineer
 Mike Kloster – assistant engineer
 Jay Lean – assistant engineer
 Bob Loftus – assistant engineer
 Danny Mormando – assistant engineer
 Duane Seykora – assistant engineer
 Brett Swain – assistant engineer
 Mike Tacci – assistant engineer
 Shari Sutcliffe – production coordinator, music contractor 
 An Rafferty – art direction, design 
 Jeff Katz – photography

References

External links
Album information

1989 debut albums
Steve Lukather albums
Albums produced by Richard Marx
Albums produced by Richie Zito
CBS Records albums